Sanborn is a surname. Notable people with the surname include:

Alan Sanborn, politician from the U.S. state of Michigan
Alvan F. Sanborn, journalist and author
Arthur Loomis Sanborn, United States federal judge
Aroline Sanborn, diarist
Ashton Sanborn (1882–1970), American archaeologist.
Chase Sanborn, trumpet player
Colin Campbell Sanborn (1897–1962), American biologist
Daniel Alfred Sanborn, surveyor
David Sanborn, American alto saxophonist
David C. Sanborn
Donald Sanborn, American Traditional Catholic Bishop
Edwin David Sanborn, New Hampshire educator
Ethel Ida Sanborn, (1883–1952) American paleobotanist and professor of botany
Franklin Benjamin Sanborn (1831–1917), Massachusetts journalist, author, and reformer, supporter of John Brown
Garrison Sanborn (born 1985), American football player
Henry B. Sanborn (1845–1912); American rancher known as the "Father of Amarillo, Texas."
Herbert Charles Sanborn (1873-1967), American philosopher, political candidate
Jack Sanborn (born 2000), American football player
Jim Sanborn, American sculptor
John B. Sanborn, lawyer, politician, and soldier
John B. Sanborn, Jr., lawyer, politician, and United States federal judge
John C. Sanborn, United States Representative
John Sewell Sanborn, Canadian educator, lawyer, judge and political figure
Kate Sanborn, author, teacher and lecturer
Kenneth Sanborn, politician and judge
Kerri Sanborn, bridge player
Nick Sanborn, automobile racer on the List of people with brain tumors
Nick Sanborn, electronic music producer and member of band Sylvan Esso
Pitts Sanborn, music critic
Ryne Sanborn, actor
Walter Sanborn, United States judge
Donald Sanborn, Sedevacantist bishop
Winfred J. Sanborn